La Palma was established in 1927 and is a populated place situated in Pinal County, Arizona, United States. The name is Spanish for "Palm".

References

Populated places in Pinal County, Arizona